Waterford Township may refer to the following places:

 Waterford Township, Fulton County, Illinois
 Waterford Township, Clay County, Iowa
 Waterford Township, Clinton County, Iowa
 Waterford Township, Oakland County, Michigan
 Waterford Township, Dakota County, Minnesota
 Waterford Township, Camden County, New Jersey
 Waterford Township, Ward County, North Dakota
 Waterford Township, Washington County, Ohio
 Waterford Township, Erie County, Pennsylvania

See also

Waterford (disambiguation)

Township name disambiguation pages